The 2021 Emir of Qatar Cup was the 49th edition of the Qatari cup tournament in men's football. It was played by the first and second level divisions of the Qatari football league structure.

Round of 16

Quarter-finals

Semi-finals

Final

Top goalscorers

References

External links
Amir Cup, Qatar Football Association

Football cup competitions in Qatar
Qatar
2020–21 in Qatari football